Myanmar Noble University (MNU) is a private university in Yangon, Myanmar, located in Thingangyun Township's Thuwanna ward. Established in 2011, MNU is accredited with Pearson Education in partnership with the University of East London in the United Kingdom.

References

External links

Education in Yangon
Educational institutions established in 2011
2011 establishments in Myanmar